Kalamazoo Christian High School is a private Christian high school in Kalamazoo, Michigan, serving students from ninth through twelfth grades.

History
The history of Christian education in Kalamazoo starts with the establishment of the first Kalamazoo Christian elementary school in 1877 by the Walnut Street Church.  The first Christian high school in Kalamazoo was established in 1939.  The high school moved to its current campus in 1960.  In November 1992 the Kalamazoo Christian High School and four K-8 Schools joined to form the Kalamazoo Christian School Association.

In 1997, a teacher was fired from his teaching position at Kalamazoo Christian High School for holding views about homosexuality that the Kalamazoo Christian Schools Association Board found to be "unbiblical."  At the time, the teacher had been at the school for thirty years.

Athletics
The school's mascot is Kaptain Comet, with its teams being called The Comets.  The school's colors are purple and gold.  The Comets are part of the Kalamazoo Valley Association.  The following MHSAA-sanctioned sports are offered with both boys and girls teams (unless specified):

Baseball (boys)
Basketball
Boys state champion - 1959, 1983, 2001 and 2008.
Bowling
Cross country
Boys state champion - 1981.
Football (boys)
Golf
Soccer
Girls state champion - 2003, 2004, 2007 and 2008.
Softball (girls)
State champion - 1996, 1997, 1998, 1999, 2000, 2002, and 2013 
Tennis
Track & field
Volleyball (girls)

See also
 Kalamazoo Central High School (which shares the same school abbreviation:  KCHS)
 Kalamazoo Public Schools

References

External links
 Kalamazoo Christian School Association

1939 establishments in Michigan
Christian schools in Michigan
Private high schools in Michigan